Senator Huston may refer to:

James N. Huston (1849–1927), Indiana State Senate
Samuel B. Huston (1858–1920), Oregon State Senate

See also
Senator Houston (disambiguation)